This is a list of mosques in Turkey. As of March 2013, there were 82,693 mosques in Turkey. The province with the highest number of mosques (3,113) was Istanbul and the lowest number (117) was Tunceli Province. This reflected an increase of mosques by 7,324 in the 10-year period since 2003.

See also

 List of Turkish Grand Mosques
 Islam in Turkey
 Lists of mosques
 List of mosques in Istanbul
 List of mosques in Europe
 List of mosques in Asia

References

 

Turkey
Mosques